The European Tour 2013/2014 – Event 3 (also known as the 2013 Bluebell Wood Open) was a professional minor-ranking snooker tournament that took place between 14 and 17 August 2013 at the Doncaster Dome in Doncaster, England.

Ricky Walden won his fourth professional title by defeating Marco Fu 4–3 in the final.

Ronnie O'Sullivan made the 700th century of his career in first round match against Lyu Haotian. Lyu led 3–1 but O'Sullivan came back to win 4–3, making his 700th century in the deciding frame.

Prize fund and ranking points
The breakdown of prize money and ranking points of the event is shown below:

1 Only professional players can earn ranking points.

Main draw

Preliminary rounds

Round 1
Best of 7 frames

Round 2
Best of 7 frames

Round 3
Best of 7 frames

Round 4
Best of 7 frames

Round 5
Best of 7 frames

Main rounds

Top half

Section 1

Section 2

Section 3

Section 4

Bottom half

Section 5

Section 6

Section 7

Section 8

Finals

Century breaks

 146, 124, 120, 107, 103  Ding Junhui
 138  Ryan Day
 137, 118  Peter Lines
 133, 129, 115, 111, 110  Shaun Murphy
 133  Dechawat Poomjaeng
 131, 129, 115, 106  Ricky Walden
 128  Michael Georgiou
 127, 102  Rod Lawler
 124  David Gilbert
 124  Jamie Burnett
 121, 107, 101  Mark Allen
 117  Jeff Cundy
 117  James Silverwood
 116, 101  Ronnie O'Sullivan
 115  Jamie O'Neill
 115  Jimmy Robertson
 113, 102  Marco Fu

 112  Peter Ebdon
 111  Ben Woollaston
 111  Jamie Jones
 108  Judd Trump
 107  Leo Fernandez
 106  Oliver Brown
 106  Tian Pengfei
 106  Mike Dunn
 106  Jack Lisowski
 105  Marcus Campbell
 105  Anthony Hamilton
 105  Li Hang
 105  Jamie Cope
 102  Joe Roberts
 101, 100  Liang Wenbo
 100  Marc Davis
 100  David Morris

References

External links
 2013 Bluebell Wood Open – Pictures by World Snooker at Facebook

ET3
2013 in English sport
August 2013 sports events in the United Kingdom